Sloan DuRoss (born October 23, 1976) is an American rower. He competed at the 2004 Summer Olympics in Athens, in the men's quadruple sculls. DuRoss was born in Hanover, New Hampshire.

References

1976 births
Living people
American male rowers
Olympic rowers of the United States
Rowers at the 2004 Summer Olympics
Pan American Games medalists in rowing
Pan American Games bronze medalists for the United States
Rowers at the 2003 Pan American Games
Medalists at the 2003 Pan American Games